Paul Steven Jones (born 18 April 1967) is a retired Welsh international football goalkeeper. During his playing career, he played for several clubs, including Wolverhampton Wanderers, Stockport County and Southampton.

Career history

Club career
Born in Chirk near Wrexham, Jones started his career at Bridgnorth Town, joining Kidderminster Harriers in 1986 and then moved to Wolverhampton Wanderers for a fee of £60,000 in 1991. He only managed to play 44 games before moving on to Stockport County in 1996 where he was ever present in the 1996–97 season.

When Stockport County manager Dave Jones joined Southampton as manager, he signed Jones. He won Southampton player of the season in 1998 and earned a call up to Wales and became the number one goalkeeper. He played for Southampton in the 2003 FA Cup final against Arsenal (which was lost 1–0) coming on as substitute for the injured Antti Niemi. He was the first ever goalkeeper to make a substitute appearance in an FA Cup final.

He left Southampton in 2004, but not before joining Liverpool on loan during a goalkeeping injury crisis, thus becoming the club's oldest post-war debutant.
 
Jones re-joined Wolverhampton Wanderers in January 2004, but was loaned out to Watford in December of that year. In January 2006, Wolves cancelled Jones' contract by mutual consent. In February 2006, he joined Queens Park Rangers for the rest of the 2005–06 season. Due to his success at the club he was given a one-year extension to his contract that would last up until May 2007. When this contract expired Jones was released by the London club and later signed for non-league Bognor Regis Town.

International career
Jones made his international debut against Scotland on 27 May 1997, coming on as a half-time substitute for Andy Marriott.

Jones won his 50th Welsh cap against Slovakia on 7 October 2006 but had a match to forget. Wales were beaten 5–1, their worst home result for 98 years and he was beaten from long range on three occasions. He marked the occasion with 50 shaved in his hair.

Honours
Southampton
FA Cup runner up - 2003

Kidderminster Harriers
FA Trophy Winner - 1987

Stockport County
Division 2 runner up (promotion to Division 1) - 1996–97

Individual
Welsh Footballer of the Year: 1999

References

External links
Paul Jones career profile

Living people
1967 births
People from Chirk
Sportspeople from Wrexham County Borough
Welsh footballers
Wales international footballers
Association football goalkeepers
Premier League players
English Football League players
Kidderminster Harriers F.C. players
Wolverhampton Wanderers F.C. players
Stockport County F.C. players
Southampton F.C. players
Liverpool F.C. players
Watford F.C. players
Queens Park Rangers F.C. players
Wales national football team non-playing staff
FA Cup Final players